Jared Perkins (January 5, 1793 – October 15, 1854) was a United States representative from New Hampshire.  He was born in Unity, New Hampshire and attended the common schools of Unity and Claremont. He studied theology and was ordained as a minister in 1824, serving for thirty years.

Perkins served on the New Hampshire Executive Council 1846–1848. He also served in the New Hampshire House of Representatives in 1850. He was elected as a Whig to the Thirty-second Congress (March 4, 1851 – March 3, 1853) but was an unsuccessful candidate for reelection in 1852 to the Thirty-third Congress. After leaving Congress, he was nominated for Governor of New Hampshire in 1854 but died before the election. In addition, he was also appointed justice of the peace in 1854 and served until his death in Nashua in 1854. He was buried in West Unity Cemetery, Unity, New Hampshire.

References

Sources

Jared Perkins at The Political Graveyard

1793 births
1854 deaths
People from Unity, New Hampshire
New Hampshire Whigs
Members of the Executive Council of New Hampshire
Members of the New Hampshire House of Representatives
Members of the United States House of Representatives from New Hampshire
Whig Party members of the United States House of Representatives
19th-century American politicians
New Hampshire Free Soilers